The Missouri Senate is the upper chamber of the Missouri General Assembly. It has 34 members, representing districts with an average population of 181,000. Its members serve four-year terms, with half the seats being up for election every two years. The Senate chooses a President Pro Tempore to serve in the absence of the lieutenant governor or when he shall have to exercise the office of governor of Missouri if there is a vacancy in that office due to death, resignation, impeachment, or incapacitation.

Members of the Missouri General Assembly are prohibited from serving more than eight years in either the state house of representatives or state senate, or a total of sixteen years, due to statutory term limits.

Elections were held in 2022.

Composition
After the 2022 general election the party representation in the Senate was:

Senate officers

Members of the Missouri Senate

Source:

Committees
Under Rule 25 of the Senate Rules, all committees are appointed by the President Pro Tem, who is currently Caleb Rowden.

Standing committees

Districts 
Missouri's 25th Senate district
 Missouri's 27th Senate district
 Missouri's 29th Senate district
 Missouri's 33rd Senate district

See also
 Political party strength in Missouri
 Missouri House of Representatives 
 Missouri Constitution

References

External links
 Missouri State Senate
 State Senate of Missouri at Project Vote Smart
 Revised Statutes of Missouri 
 Missouri State Government  
 
 Missouri State Senate, 99th General Assembly
Publications by or about the Missouri Senate at Internet Archive.

Missouri General Assembly
State upper houses in the United States